Garra birostris is a fish species in the genus Garra endemic to India.This species reaches a length of .

References

Arunachalam, M. and S. Nandagopal, 2014. A new species of the genus Garra Hamilton, (Cypriniformes: Cyprinidae) from Nethravathi River, Western Ghats, India. Species 10(24):43-57.

External links 

Cyprinid fish of Asia
Taxa named by Kongbrailatpan Nebeshwar Sharma
Taxa named by Waikhom Vishwanath
Fish described in 2013
Garra